Eds FF is a Swedish football club located in Ed.

Background
Eds FF currently plays in Division 4 Bohuslän/Dalsland which is the sixth tier of Swedish football. They play their home matches at the Bergslätt IP in Ed.

The club is affiliated to Dalslands Fotbollförbund. Eds FF have competed in the Svenska Cupen on 7 occasions and have played 10 matches in the competition. They played in the 2008 Svenska Cupen beating FC Trollhättan by 2–1 (aet) at home in the first round before losing 1–4 at home to IF Brommapojkarna in the second round with an attendance of 600 spectators.

Season to season

Footnotes

External links
 Eds FF – Official website

Football clubs in Västra Götaland County
Association football clubs established in 1938
1938 establishments in Sweden